Toronto Knob Hill Farms were a junior ice hockey team who played one season in the fledgling Metro Junior A League in 1962-63. Formerly the Unionville Seaforths, the team moved to downtown Toronto for the Metro League's second year and became associated with grocery retailer Knob Hill Farms.

The team played only for the one season and folded along with the league in 1963. The head coach, returning from the previous season, was Johnny "Peanuts" O'Flaherty.

Yearly Results

Defunct Ontario Hockey League teams
Kn
Ice hockey clubs established in 1962
1962 establishments in Ontario
1963 disestablishments in Ontario
Sports clubs disestablished in 1963